Ankara University Medical School is a medical school located in the Sıhhiye district of Ankara, Turkey. It opened in 1945 as the second medical school in Turkey, when Istanbul Medical School could no longer keep up with the demand for trained doctors.

Ankara medical school is  the third best medical school in turkey according to QS.

Campuses 
Ankara medical school has three campuses

Morphology Campus 
Morphology campus was established in 1967 . it contains Dean’s office, offices of Vice Deans and Faculty Secretary, the central library, 13 Departments, 4 Disciplines and some administrative offices .

İbni Sina Campus 
the campus is a big hospital that contains internal and surgical medical departments, various medical care units and clinical and molecular laboratories.

Cebeci Campus

References

Ankara University
Medical schools in Turkey
1945 establishments in Turkey
Educational institutions established in 1945